Cevasco is a surname. Notable people with the surname include:

Mario Cevasco (1938–1999), Italian water polo player
Miguel Cevasco (born 1986), Peruvian football player